Pieve Porto Morone is a comune (municipality) in the Province of Pavia in the Italian region Lombardy, located about 45 km southeast of Milan and about 25 km southeast of Pavia.

Pieve Porto Morone borders the following municipalities: Arena Po, Badia Pavese, Castel San Giovanni, Costa de' Nobili, Monticelli Pavese, Santa Cristina e Bissone, Sarmato, Zerbo.

References

Cities and towns in Lombardy